Becca Bernstein (born in 1977) is an  American artist. She lives and works in Oregon and Scotland.

Life and work

Becca Bernstein graduated from Lewis and Clark College in Portland, Oregon and studied at the Museum of Modern Art in New York City. She survived two near-fatal car accidents in the summer of 2000, recovering fully from spinal and internal injuries.

Bernstein’s art typically addresses issues of community and human interdependence. She has also worked closely with residents of senior care homes in Oregon and Scotland, which she says has led her to explore human relationships in the contemporary age.

Bernstein was selected by Southwest Art Magazine in 2008 as one of 21 emerging artists to watch. She won the Kimberley Gales Emerging Artist Award in 2005, the Lake Oswego Public Art Award in 2007, and the George Sugarman Foundation Grant (The George Sugarman Foundation) in 2007 for socially conscious artists. Her work can be found in the public collections of the City of Lake Oswego, Oregon, the Interstate Firehouse Cultural Center, the Northwest Business for Culture and the Arts, the Oregon Ballet Theater, and the Grace Institute, New York. She is represented by galleries in Portland, Oregon, Park City, Utah, Minneapolis, Minnesota, and Aberdeen, Scotland. Bernstein is best known for her paintings, particularly of elderly subjects, but she also earned a grant from the Regional Arts & Culture Council for her 2008 conceptual installation in Portland. She is mentioned in Art in America magazine for her awards.

Her work focuses on human relationships, family, and ageing. She's notable for using unconventional materials like patchwork quilts and slate tiles. She explores issues of human fragility and strength. In her 2008 artist's statement for an installation she wrote:
"I am witness to the modern anomaly of dividing the tribe—of the separation of generations from one another, each to their respective institutions. As an artist, my interest in this subject has led me to seek out communities of all kinds for my work, both traditional and uniquely present-day, exploring the relationships we have developed or abandoned in this contemporary age."

See also
List of artists and art institutions in Portland, Oregon

References

Lewis & Clark College alumni
American women painters
Living people
1977 births
Painters from Oregon
20th-century American painters
20th-century American women artists
21st-century American women artists